Yambio County is an administrative state capital of Western Equatoria State, South Sudan.

References

Western Equatoria
Counties of South Sudan